Paxillin is a protein that in humans is encoded by the PXN gene. Paxillin is expressed at focal adhesions of non-striated cells and at costameres of striated muscle cells, and it functions to adhere cells to the extracellular matrix. Mutations in PXN as well as abnormal expression of paxillin protein has been implicated in the progression of various cancers.

Structure 

Human paxillin is 64.5 kDa in molecular weight and 591 amino acids in length.

The C-terminal region of paxillin is composed of four tandem double zinc finger LIM domains that are cysteine/histidine-rich with conserved repeats; these serve as binding sites for the protein tyrosine phosphatase-PEST, tubulin and serves as the targeting motif for focal adhesions.

The N-terminal region of paxillin has five highly conserved leucine-rich sequences termed LD motifs, which mediate several interactions, including that with pp125FAK and vinculin. The LD motifs are predicted to form amphipathic alpha helices, with each leucine residue positioned on one face of the alpha helix to form a hydrophobic protein-binding interface. The N-terminal region also has a proline-rich domain that has potential for Src-SH3 binding. Three N-terminal YXXP motifs may serve as binding sites for talin or v-Crk SH2.

Function 

Paxillin is a signal transduction adaptor protein discovered in 1990 in the laboratory of Keith Burridge The C-terminal region of paxillin contains four LIM domains that target paxillin to focal adhesions. It is presumed through a direct association with the cytoplasmic tail of beta-integrin. The N-terminal region of paxillin is rich in protein–protein interaction sites. The proteins that bind to paxillin are diverse and include protein tyrosine kinases, such as Src and focal adhesion kinase (FAK), structural proteins, such as vinculin and actopaxin, and regulators of actin organization, such as COOL/PIX and PKL/GIT. Paxillin is tyrosine-phosphorylated by FAK and Src upon integrin engagement or growth factor stimulation, creating binding sites for the adapter protein Crk.

In striated muscle cells, paxillin is important in costamerogenesis, or the formation of costameres, which are specialized focal adhesion-like structures in muscle cells that tether Z-disc structures across the sarcolemma to the extracellular matrix. The current working model of costamerogenesis is that in cultured, undifferentiated myoblasts, alpha-5 integrin, vinculin and paxillin are in complex and located primarily at focal adhesions. During early differentiation, premyofibril formation through sarcomerogenesis occurs, and premyofibrils assemble at structures that are typical of focal adhesions in non-muscle cells; a similar phenomenon is observed in cultured cardiomyocytes. Premyofibrils become nascent myofibrils, which progressively align to form mature myofibrils and nascent costamere structures appear. Costameric proteins redistribute to form mature costameres. While the precise functions of paxillin in this process are still being unveiled, studies investigating binding partners of paxillin have provided mechanistic understanding of its function. The proline-rich region of paxillin specifically binds to the second SH3 domain of ponsin, which occurs after the onset of the myogenic differentiation and with expression restricted to costameres. We also know that the binding of paxillin to focal adhesion kinase (FAK) is critical for directing paxillin function. The phosphorylation of FAK at serine-910 regulates the interaction of FAK with paxillin, and controls the stability of paxillin at costameres in cardiomyocytes, with phosphorylation reducing the half-life of paxillin. This is important to understand because the stability of the FAK-paxillin interaction is likely inversely related to the stability of the vinculin-paxillin interaction, which would likely indicate the strength of the costamere interaction as well as sarcomere reorganization; processes which have been linked to dilated cardiomyopathy. Additional studies have shown that paxillin itself is phosphorylated, and this participates in hypertrophic signaling pathways in cardiomyocytes. Treatment of cardiomyocytes with the hypertrophic agonist, phenylephrine stimulated a rapid increase in tyrosine phosphorylation paxillin, which was mediated by protein tyrosine kinases.

The structural reorganization of paxillin in cardiomyocytes has also been detected in mouse models of dilated cardiomyopathy. In a mouse model of tropomodulin overexpression, paxillin distribution was revamped coordinate with increased phosphorylation and cleavage of paxillin. Similarly, paxillin was shown to have altered localization in cardiomyocytes from transgenic mice expressing a constitutively-active rac1. These data show that alterations in costameric organization, in part via paxillin redistribution, may be a pathogenic mechanism in dilated cardiomyopathy. In addition, in mice subjected to pressure overload-induced cardiac hypertrophy, inducing hypertrophic cardiomyopathy, paxillin expression levels increased, suggesting a role for paxillin in both types of cardiomyopathy.

Clinical significance
Paxillin has been shown to have a clinically-significant role in patients with several cancer types. Enhanced expression of paxillin has been detected in premalignant areas of hyperplasia, squamous metaplasia and goblet cell metaplasia, as well as dysplastic lesions and carcinoma in high-risk patients with lung adenocarcinoma. Mutations in PXN have been associated with enhanced  tumor growth, cell proliferation, and invasion in lung cancer tissues.

During tumor transformation, a consistent finding is that paxillin protein is recruited and phosphorylated. Paxillin plays a role in the MET tyrosine kinase signaling pathway, which is upregulated in many cancers.

Interactions 

Paxillin has been shown to interact with:
 PTP-PEST,
 tubulin,
 VCL,
 pp125FAK. 
 SRC 
 SORBS1.
 PARVA and
 ILK

References

Further reading

External links 
MBInfo: Paxillin
Paxillin Info with links in the Cell Migration Gateway 
 
 
 

Proteins